Pike County is located in the U.S. state of Alabama. As of the 2020 census the population was 33,009. Its county seat is Troy. Its name is in honor of General Zebulon Pike, of New Jersey, an explorer who led an expedition to southern Colorado and discovered Pikes Peak in 1806.

Pike County comprises the Troy, AL Micropolitan Statistical Area.

History
The area of present-day Pike County was inhabited by Native Americans from prehistoric times.  Spain, France, and Great Britain all claimed the area, but except for scattered military outposts like Fort Toulouse near present-day Wetumpka, European inhabitants were concentrated along the Gulf Coast, with very few settling inland.  In 1763, at the close of the French and Indian War, France ceded all the territories of New France (including what is now Pike County, Spanish claims notwithstanding) to the victorious British.  In the same year, the Royal Proclamation of 1763 prohibited British subjects from settling in this area, which was reserved for the native peoples.

Between the years of 1767 and 1783, the area that is now Pike County was part of the colony of British West Florida, though still with nearly all whites concentrated in the settlements along the coast or near the Mississippi River.  After the American victory in the Revolutionary War, the British ceded the territory to Spain, an American ally.  However, Spain and the United States both claimed the region fell until Spain gave up its claims to the land north of the 31st parallel (present-day border of Alabama and Florida) in the Treaty of Madrid (1795).  The United States organized the entire region north of that border and east of Georgia as the Mississippi Territory.  In 1812, following the Louisiana Purchase, the United States unilaterally annexed the Mobile District from Spanish West Florida, most of the rest of which was acqurired with the Adams–Onís Treaty of 1819 (ratified 1821).

In 1817, the Mississippi Territory was divided, with the western part admitted to the Union as the State of Mississippi; the remainder was admitted as the State of Alabama in 1819, and was soon organized into counties.  Pike County is one of the oldest in the state, organized on December 17, 1821. The temporary county seat was established at the house of Andrew Townsend. Pike County comprised a large tract of country, so large that it was called the State of Pike, including a part of what are now Crenshaw, Montgomery, Macon, Bullock, and Barbour counties, and extended to the Chattahoochee River on the east.

Geography

Major highways
 U.S. Highway 29
 U.S. Highway 231
 State Route 10
 State Route 87
 State Route 93
 State Route 125
 State Route 130
 State Route 167
 State Route 201
 State Route 223

Adjacent counties
Bullock County (northeast)
Barbour County (east)
Dale County (southeast)
Coffee County (south)
Crenshaw County (west)
Montgomery County (northwest)

Demographics

2000 census
As of the census of 2000, there were 29,605 people, 11,933 households, and 7,649 families living in the county.  The population density was 44 people per square mile (17/km2).  There were 13,981 housing units at an average density of 21 per square mile (8/km2).  The racial makeup of the county was 60.77% White, 36.60% Black or African American, 0.66% Native American, 0.35% Asian, 0.02% Pacific Islander, 0.26% from other races, and 1.35% from two or more races.  1.23% of the population were Hispanic or Latino of any race.

There were 11,933 households, out of which 29.70% had children under the age of 18 living with them, 43.60% were married couples living together, 16.80% had a female householder with no husband present, and 35.90% were non-families. 29.80% of all households were made up of individuals, and 11.00% had someone living alone who was 65 years of age or older.  The average household size was 2.38 and the average family size was 2.98.

In the county, the population was spread out, with 24.40% under the age of 18, 15.80% from 18 to 24, 26.00% from 25 to 44, 21.20% from 45 to 64, and 12.60% who were 65 years of age or older.  The median age was 32 years. For every 100 females, there were 89.50 males.  For every 100 females age 18 and over, there were 84.90 males.

The median income for a household in the county was $25,551, and the median income for a family was $34,132. Males had a median income of $27,094 versus $18,758 for females. The per capita income for the county was $14,904.  About 18.50% of families and 23.10% of the population were below the poverty line, including 29.90% of those under age 18 and 21.90% of those age 65 or over.

2010 census
As of the census of 2010, there were 32,899 people, 13,210 households, and 7,759 families living in the county. The population density was 49 people per square mile (19/km2). There were 15,267 housing units at an average density of 22.7 per square mile (8.8/km2). The racial makeup of the county was 58.2% White, 36.6% Black or African American, 0.6% Native American, 2.0% Asian, 0.1% Pacific Islander, 1.0% from other races, and 1.5% from two or more races. 2.2% of the population were Hispanic or Latino of any race.

There were 13,210 households, out of which 23.9% had children under the age of 18 living with them, 38.1% were married couples living together, 16.2% had a female householder with no husband present, and 41.3% were non-families. 30.3% of all households were made up of individuals, and 9.5% had someone living alone who was 65 years of age or older.  The average household size was 2.34 and the average family size was 2.94.

In the county, the population was spread out, with 20.3% under the age of 18, 21.2% from 18 to 24, 22.7% from 25 to 44, 22.9% from 45 to 64, and 12.8% who were 65 years of age or older. The median age was 31.4 years. For every 100 females, there were 91.3 males. For every 100 females age 18 and over, there were 92.4 males.

The median income for a household in the county was $29,181, and the median income for a family was $41,570. Males had a median income of $38,605 versus $26,495 for females. The per capita income for the county was $19,013. About 20.5% of families and 28.6% of the population were below the poverty line, including 35.8% of those under age 18 and 16.9% of those age 65 or over.

2020 census

As of the 2020 United States census, there were 33,009 people, 11,601 households, and 6,422 families residing in the county.

Government

Communities

Cities
Brundidge
Troy (county seat)

Towns
Banks
Goshen

Unincorporated communities
 China Grove
 Curry
 Henderson
 Jonesville
 Josie
 Kent
 Needmore
 Orion
 Pronto
 Shady Grove
 Spring Hill

Notable people
 

Littleton Prince (?-1833), a white man executed for helping a runaway slave.

See also
National Register of Historic Places listings in Pike County, Alabama
Properties on the Alabama Register of Landmarks and Heritage in Pike County, Alabama

References

External links
 Pike County Chamber of Commerce
 Pike County Sheriff's Office
 

 
1821 establishments in Alabama
Populated places established in 1821